Gheorghe Ciurea (born 12 October 1962) is a Romanian former footballer who played as a midfielder. After he ended his playing career he worked as a manager at teams from the Romanian lower leagues with a short spell in the first league at Universitatea Craiova.

Honours
Universitatea Craiova
Divizia A: 1990–91
Cupa României: 1990–91

References

1962 births
Living people
Romanian footballers
Association football midfielders
Liga I players
Liga II players
Faroe Islands Premier League players
CSM Reșița players
CS Universitatea Craiova players
FCV Farul Constanța players
Havnar Bóltfelag players
Romanian expatriate footballers
Romanian expatriate sportspeople in the Faroe Islands
Expatriate footballers in the Faroe Islands
Romanian football managers